João Teixeira da Rocha Pinto (22 March 1876 – 25 November 1917) was a Portuguese military officer who served throughout his career in the administration of Portuguese colonies of Africa. João Pinto bore the nickname The Devil's Chief (Portuguese: Capitão Diabo). He gained distinction for his role in administering the military contingents of Portuguese Mozambique during the late years of World War I.

Early life 
João Teixeira da Rocha Pinto was named after his father João Teixeira Pinto, who was called o Kurika (Kowanyama dialect: the Lion). He acquired this nickname for his courage in the possession of the colony of Portuguese Angola. His mother was Margarida Conceição da Rocha Pinto. João da Rocha Pinto was married to Maria Amélia da Rosa Pacheco Teixeira Pinto.

Military career 

Pinto served as an officer in various Portuguese colonies in Africa. First from 1902 to 1911, in Portuguese Angola, in following his fathers footsteps. In Portuguese Guinea, he played a decisive role in the pacification of the Oio Region between 1912 and 1916. Between 1913 and 1915, Pinto used Askari troops to impose Portuguese rule and to crush resistance to hut tax by destroying villages and seizing cattle, which caused many to flee to Senegal or the forests. The cost of his forces and the return to budget deficits led to his recall in 1915.

Upon the onset of the Portuguese declaration of war against Germany in 1916, Pinto was transferred for the military administration of Portuguese Mozambique. In Mozambique, Pinto oversaw troop movements and took command of several offensives into German East Africa, in coordination with both the British and Belgian armies. The East African Campaign continued despite the majority of the colony being overrun. The Imperial German chief commander in East Africa, Paul von Lettow-Vorbeck (The Lion of Africa), decided to resist the occupying armies with the first modern use of guerrilla warfare tactics.

Battle of Ngomano and death 
João Pinto was struck and killed fighting against a German attack in the defense of Fort Ngomano. The Portuguese suffered a heavy defeat in a rout, with all commanding officers killed in battle and all soldiers either became casualties or were captured. In all, 25 Portuguese and 162 Askari were killed while only a few Askari and one German died on the attacking side. Seven hundred prisoners of war were used by the Germans as porters for the 250,000 rounds of ammunition, six machine guns and several hundred rifles that were also captured. This much needed German victory effectively resupplied the whole of von Lettow-Vorbeck's army.

Legacy 
Vila Teixeira Pinto (now Canchungo) was named after him.

References

External links

1876 births
1917 deaths
Colonial people in Angola
Portuguese military personnel killed in World War I